Chantal Galladé (born 17 December 1972 in Winterthur) is a Swiss politician, represented the Canton of Zürich in the Swiss National Council as member of the Social Democratic Party of Switzerland (SP) from December 2003 until December 2018.

Early life and education 
Born and raised in the municipality of Winterthur, Galladé is citizen of the municipality of Isérables in the canton of Valais. She attended an apprenticeship as merchant (KV) from 1989 to 1992, studied avocationally on higher education entrance qualification (Maturitätschule für Erwachsene) by 1996, and graduated on pedagogy and political science at the University of Zürich in 2008. Besides, Galladé was engaged as commissioner for apprenticeships, professor at the cantonal college, and member of the parliament (Kantonsrat) of the Canton of Zürich.

Political career 
In 1990, Chantal Galladé became a member of the Social Democratic Party (SP). She co-initiated the youth parliament (Jugendparlament), the youth lobby (Jugendlobby) and the cultural center (Kulturzentrum) in Winterthur in 1994. Three years later, Galladé was elected as member of the SP party in the parliament of the Canton of Zürich by 2003. Since December 2003, she's member of the Swiss National Council, among others focussing on the fields of  youth, sustainability and national security policy.

At the beginning of June 2018, the eligible voters elected Galladé school president of the district school administration (Kreisschulpflege) in Winterthur Stadt-Töss. Due to the full-time office, she will step down from the National Council at the end of November 2018. In February 2019, she decided to change to the Green Liberal Party (GLP) as she didn't agree with the SP, who opposition a further cooperation between the European Union and Switzerland due to Workers' Unions concerns.

Personal life 
Chantal Galladé is mother of a daughter born in 2005. She was in a relationship with Daniel Jositsch.

References

External links

  
 

1972 births
Living people
Members of the National Council (Switzerland)
People from Winterthur
University of Zurich alumni
Social Democratic Party of Switzerland politicians
Canton of Valais politicians
Swiss educational theorists
Swiss sociologists
Swiss women sociologists
Political writers
Women members of the National Council (Switzerland)
Women political writers
20th-century Swiss women politicians
20th-century Swiss politicians
21st-century Swiss women politicians
21st-century Swiss politicians